Xingcheng Subdistrict is a subdistrict located on eastern Fangshan District, Beijing, China. It is completedly surrounded by Yancun Town from all four sides. Its population was 21,663 in 2020. 

The subdistrict's name Xingcheng is an abbreviation of Shoudu Weixingcheng, which was the nature of the region when it was formed back in 1996.

Administrative Divisions 
In the year 2021, Xingcheng Subdistrict consisted of 7 communities. They are listed as follows:

See also 
 List of township-level divisions of Beijing

References 

Fangshan District
Subdistricts of Beijing